Dustin Neil Diamond (January 7, 1977 – February 1, 2021) was an American actor and stand-up comedian, best known for his role as Samuel "Screech" Powers throughout the Saved by the Bell franchise.

Early life and family
Diamond was born in San Jose, California, the son of Jaimee and Mark Diamond. His father taught digital electronics for a computer processing firm, and his mother was a computer operator for Pacific Bell. Diamond was Jewish and attended Zion Lutheran School.

Career
Diamond began acting as a child. He became known for playing Samuel "Screech" Powers on the television show Saved by the Bell, a role he played for close to thirteen years from its beginning as Good Morning, Miss Bliss (1988–89) through its final incarnation, Saved by the Bell: The New Class (1994–2000). Continuing the series into college, Saved by the Bell: The College Years shows most of the cast transplanted into not only the same college, but also the same college dormitory, where Screech continued his typical misadventures. The College Years was canceled after one season. Diamond returned to Bayside High as Principal Belding's assistant in The New Class episodes, remaining with the show until its cancellation.

Appearances after Saved by the Bell
Diamond began doing stand-up comedy after the end of Saved by the Bell and toured on and off after that. He was also featured on a number of game and reality shows including The Weakest Link and Celebrity Boxing 2. Diamond also made several cameo appearances in films, including appearances in Made (2001) and Dickie Roberts: Former Child Star (2003).

In 2007, Diamond was a cast member of the fifth season of Celebrity Fit Club. During his run on the show, he came into conflict with former American Idol finalist Kimberley Locke, country singer Cledus T. Judd, rapper Da Brat, the program's host Ant, and the program's trainer, former USMC sergeant Harvey Walden IV. During one episode, Diamond mentioned what may have happened if he were to challenge Ant to "physical combat" and after Harvey Walden defended Ant, Diamond subsequently said the same to him, causing Walden to lose his temper.

Following Celebrity Fit Club, Diamond played roles as "Alumnus Guy #1" in American Pie Presents: The Book of Love (2009), in a supporting role in the sports comedy Tetherball: The Movie (2010), and as Bernardo, the castle guard, in the partially-animated science fiction comedy Hamlet A.D.D. (2014).

Sex tape
In 2006, Diamond directed and released his own celebrity sex tape, Screeched – Saved by the Smell. According to Melanie McFarland's retelling of a press release, Diamond said the tape got out because he and a group of friends had a "monthly gathering" wherein they exchanged such tapes. Several years later, Diamond said in a Where Are They Now? interview on the Oprah Winfrey Network that he was not in the sex tape; rather, a stunt double had his likeness superimposed.

Behind the Bell
In 2009, Diamond published an inside story of the show's cast and crew, from his point of view, titled Behind the Bell. The book paints an unflattering portrait of many of Diamond's colleagues and their allegedly sordid backstage behavior. Some of these claims have been repudiated by Diamond's colleagues and questioned by critics. Diamond later commented on the book's content in a December 2013 appearance on an Oprah: Where Are They Now? segment on the OWN Network in which he stated that the book was ghost written by an author who simply interviewed him and compiled the book from his answers. He claimed that many parts of the book, such as allegations of teen sex and drug use, were fabricated from very minor statements he made during the interviews.

Other work
Diamond was also a musician and formed an alternative metal band called Salty The Pocketknife. Diamond played bass and wrote much of the music as well. Shortly after recording their first album, the band split up due to internal disagreements. Diamond also appeared on truTV's The Smoking Gun Presents: World's Dumbest... as a commentator.

He appeared as a host at the 12th annual Gathering of the Juggalos.

In August 2013, Diamond became a housemate on the twelfth series of Celebrity Big Brother in the UK. He became the fourth housemate to be evicted on Day 16.

Diamond was a spokesperson for the Rockford, Illinois-based insurance company Insurance King. In some Insurance King commercials he is featured in, he makes several references to Saved By the Bell (with logos in the commercial saying “Saved By the King”). In other commercials, he is shown to be pulled over, not caring about the already numerous tickets he has because he is “saved by the King!”, being in a Western style standoff, and him being a terrible barber.

Professional wrestling career
Diamond was a fan of professional wrestling. He appeared at Memphis Championship Wrestling in April 2000. He was a part of a skit with The Kat where was beaten up by Chip Diver, the Fabulous Rocker, and Dannie B.

On September 18, 2002, he appeared on an NWA-TNA's Asylum weekly pay-per-view. Billed as Screech, he challenged TNA's bellkeeper, Tiny the Bellkeeper, to a boxing match. Screech won by knockout in 42 seconds.

In 2008, Diamond was a contestant on Hulk Hogan's Celebrity Championship Wrestling, broadcast on CMT.

Diamond was a special guest referee for a match at Celebrity Big Bang Wrestling, Mistress Devon James vs Susan Finkelstein on July 22, 2010.

On February 11, 2011, Diamond teamed with Jordan McEntrye and Knight Wagner, losing to MsChif, Marion Fontaine and Krotch in an intergender match at AAW in Merrionette Park, Illinois. On March 17, 2011, he teamed with Bushwhacker Luke, Izzy Slapawitz and Doink the Clown to beat Virgil, Ashley Sixx, Celine Jean and Sheena at TWE Rethinking Rumble in Vaughan, Ontario. He lost his final match in a tag during the main event of FTW Summer of Synn, in Ronkonkoma, New York, on July 7, 2012.

Personal life
In 2001, Diamond filed for bankruptcy in California. He moved to Port Washington, Wisconsin, in 2003. On June 13, 2006, he asked listeners of The Howard Stern Show to visit his website and purchase a T-shirt, reading "I paid $15.00 to save Screeech's house" (spelling "Screech" with an extra E for copyright reasons). He said he hoped to sell 30,000 shirts in order to raise $250,000 and avoid foreclosure on his house. Diamond moved to Florida in 2018, and put his house in Port Washington up for sale the following year.

He reportedly married longtime girlfriend Jennifer Misner in 2009, separated in 2013 and later divorced, although his death certificate lists him as having never married. They did not have any children.

On December 26, 2014, Diamond was arrested in Ozaukee County, Wisconsin, for possession of a switchblade knife, which he was alleged to have pulled during a bar altercation in which a man was stabbed. Amanda Schutz, his fiancée, was found guilty of disorderly conduct and fined $500. On May 29, 2015, he was convicted of two misdemeanors: carrying a concealed weapon and disorderly conduct. He was cleared of the most serious charge, recklessly endangering public safety. On June 25, he was sentenced to four months in jail. He served three months and was released on probation, though his probation agent later determined that he had violated his terms and he was arrested again in May 2016.

Illness and death
In early January 2021, Diamond was diagnosed with extensive stage four small cell carcinoma of the lungs. He completed one round of chemotherapy in Cape Coral, Florida, but died from the disease on February 1, 2021, at age 44.

NASCAR tribute 
After Diamond's death, Dan Block, the founder of Insurance King, partnered with Josh Bilicki, driver of the #52 Rick Ware Racing Ford, to run a tribute car for Diamond, finishing 18th in the 2021 Verizon 200 at the Brickyard. Block and Diamond were close friends, and Block would say of Diamond "Everyone he was surrounded with was because of who he was," Block said. "He had a few people who were around him because of the person. The people who were treating him not like Screech, could talk to him and give him tough love ... he really didn't have many of us around him. It definitely went above and beyond the call of a business relationship."

Filmography

References

External links
 
 
 

1977 births
2021 deaths
20th-century American comedians
20th-century American male actors
21st-century American comedians
21st-century American male actors
American male child actors
American male television actors
American stand-up comedians
Comedians from California
Deaths from lung cancer in Florida
Film directors from California
Film directors from Wisconsin
Jewish American male actors
Jewish American male comedians
Male actors from San Jose, California
Musicians from San Jose, California
Participants in American reality television series
People from Port Washington, Wisconsin
21st-century American Jews